The Montcalm Builders are a professional ice hockey team based in Saint-Roch-de-l'Achigan, Quebec, Canada. The team is part of the Ligue Nord-Américaine de Hockey (LNAH), and plays at the Complexe JC Perreault. The team was announced as an expansion team for the LNAH in April 2022 with the intent to begin play immediately in the 2022–23 season following an expansion draft set for early June 2022. 

The team announced its first head coach, Éric Labrosse, on June 1, 2022. However, Labrosse left the team before its first game to become an assistant coach for the Moncton Wildcats and was replaced by Daniel Gauthier.

Season-by-season record
Note: GP = Games played, W = Wins, L = Losses, OTL = Overtime losses, SOL = shootout losses, Pts = Points, GF = Goals for, GA = Goals against, PIM = Penalties in minutes

References

External links
 Bâtisseurs de Montcalm official site

Ligue Nord-Américaine de Hockey teams
Sport in Laval, Quebec